The United States Penitentiary, Atlanta (USP Atlanta) is a low-security United States federal prison for male inmates in Atlanta, Georgia. It is operated by the Federal Bureau of Prisons, a division of the United States Department of Justice. The facility also has a detention center for pretrial and holdover inmates, and a satellite prison camp for minimum-security male inmates.

History
In 1899, President William McKinley authorized the construction of a new federal prison in Atlanta, Georgia.

Georgia Congressman Leonidas F. Livingston advocated placing the prison in Atlanta. William S. Eames, an architect from St. Louis, Missouri; and U.S. Attorney General John W. Griggs, on April 18, 1899, traveled to Atlanta to select the prison site.

Construction was completed in January 1902 and the Atlanta Federal Penitentiary opened with the transfer of six convicts from the Sing Sing Correctional Facility in upstate New York. They were the beneficiaries of the Three Prisons Act of 1891, which established penitentiaries in Leavenworth, Kansas; Atlanta, Georgia; and McNeil Island, Washington. The first two remain open today, the third closed in 1976.  The Atlanta site was the largest Federal prison, with a capacity of 3,000 inmates. Inmate case files presented mini-biographies of men confined in the penitentiary. Prison officials recorded every detail of their lives - their medical treatments, their visitors, their letters to and from the outside world

The main prison building was designed by the St. Louis, Missouri architect firm of Eames and Young, which also designed the main building at the United States Penitentiary, Leavenworth. It encompassed  and had a capacity of 1200 inmates. The facility was subsequently renamed the United States Penitentiary, Atlanta when US government created the Federal Bureau of Prisons in 1930.

In the 1980s, USP Atlanta was used as a detention center for Cuban refugees from the Mariel Boatlift who were ineligible for release into American society.

USP Atlanta was formerly one of several facilities, including the Federal Transfer Center, Oklahoma City, that were used to house prisoners who are being transferred between prisons.

Notable incidents

1987 riots
In November 1987, Cuban detainees, tired of indefinite confinement and in constant fear of being deported back to Cuba, rioted for 11 days, staged a bloody riot, seizing dozens of hostages and setting fire to the prison. At least one prisoner was killed. Local hospitals reported admitting a total of eight Cubans suffering gunshot wounds, along with two prison guards who were slightly injured.

Notable inmates (current and former)
*Inmates released from custody prior to 1982 are not listed on the Bureau of Prisons website.

Organized crime figures

Fraudsters

Political figures

Public officials

Others

See also

List of U.S. federal prisons
Federal Bureau of Prisons
Incarceration in the United States

References

External links

United States Penitentiary, Atlanta
National Archives and Records Administration Southeast Region, Morrow, GA
Atlanta FBI Division, a brief history
Atlanta Federal Penitentiary Inmate Case Files, 1902-1921 at the National Archives at Atlanta

Atlanta
Prisons in Georgia (U.S. state)
Buildings and structures in Atlanta
1902 establishments in Georgia (U.S. state)